Falerii Veteres, now Civita Castellana, was one of the chief cities of the duodecim populi of ancient Etruria. The site is about 2 km west of the course of the Via Flaminia, some 50 km north of Rome.

The legendary foundation of the site has been linked to colonists coming from Argos. The people of the area, the Faliscans, spoke a language that was distinct from that of the Etruscans.

Following a revolt by the Faliscan tribe in around 241 BC, the Romans resettled the population of Falerii Veteres at Falerii Novi, a less defensible location.

References

External links
 

Etruscan cities